Tali Rights, The Collecting Society of Film and Television Creators in Israel Ltd. [Hevrat HaTamlugim shel Yotzrei HaKolnoa V'HaTelevizia B'Israel], is the copyright collecting society for Israeli screenwriters and directors.

Tali represents the public performance rights, rental rights, broadcasting rights and the making available to the public rights, as well as the rights to collect remuneration for the use of blank tapes, in regards to script and direction creations of its members.

TALI was founded in 2000 by the community of Israeli screenwriters and directors led by the scriptwriter Avi Shemesh (C.E.O. of TALI until 2008, then chairman of the board from 2008 to 2012) and the director Ori Inbar who initiated the struggle for recognizing the director as author (chairman of the board until 2005) . The shareholders of TALI are the creators themselves, with each screenwriter and director, veteran and newcomer alike, holding an equal share.

Background 
TALI manages the public performance rights, leasing rights, broadcast rights and public access rights, as well as the rights to collect blank media levies with regard to the screenplays and directed works of its members. 
TALI collects royalties for the use of its members' works within the State of Israel and distributes them among its members in accordance with a formula whose parameters are known. It has established a database about its members' works, through which it manages the reporting, the use of the works and the distribution of royalties. 
Membership in TALI does not require a membership fee; its overhead costs are deducted from the royalties paid by the users. Each TALI member has full control over the number of screenplays and/or directed works, or rights to them, that he/she turns over to TALI's management, and he/she can exclude any works or rights at any stage.

TALI’s repertoire includes, among other items:
 Dramatic works, including feature films, TV drama specials and dramatic series;
 Documentary works at least 25 minutes long, including documentary films and news documentaries;
 Entertaining documentary works at least 25 minutes long, including reality films and those made via hidden camera;
 Entertainment works with dramatic elements, including sketch comedy and comedy;
 children's programs with dramatic elements;
 Music videos (video clips), produced especially for a song and which include performance of the song, or a film of a song made during a live performance.

TALI has licensing agreements with various users, including broadcasters, websites, VOD content providers and other companies that use audiovisual works. In this context TALI has licensing agreements with: Keshet, Reshet, YES, HOT, KAN – Israeli Public Broadcasting Corporation, Walla, Mako, Google Youtube, and others.

Organizational structure 
TALI is headed by a 9-member board of directors. The board includes three screenwriters, three directors and three external board members. Under the board is the CEO, who is responsible for implementing the policy of the board, and under the CEO there are three departments: the Membership and Documentation Department, the Information and Economics Department and the Finance and Disbursal Department. The company has nine employees.

Company activities 
 Conducting negotiations with potential users and concludes licensing agreements with them for the use of works TALI manages in exchange for royalties.
 Follow-up, documentation, and systematic record-keeping on the use of works in TALI's repertoire, and monitoring user reports.
 Collecting royalties and disbursing them to members, producing accounts according to a transparent distribution index.
 Assisting and advising members in all areas regarding protection of their royalty rights.
 Enforcing members' rights, which includes taking legal action against users who violate these rights.
 Lobbying for legislation and regulation to promote and recognize the rights of screenwriters and directors.
 Representing Israeli audio-visual artists in international organizations.

Data 
TALI represents over 3,000 creators.
TALI manages an over 100,000 Israeli audiovisual works. 
Each year, thousands of works are added to TALI's repertoire.

References

External links 
 Tali Website

Copyright collection societies
Organizations established in 2000
Music organizations based in Israel